La reina soy yo (English: I am the Queen), formerly known as Puro Flow, is a Mexican telenovela produced by Teleset and Sony Pictures Television for Televisa. It is an adaptation of the Colombian telenovela La Reina del Flow broadcast by Caracol Televisión. The series stars Michelle Renaud, Mané de la Parra, and Lambda García. It premiered first in the United States on Univision on 13 May 2019 and ended on 30 August 2019. In Mexico the series premiered on Las Estrellas on 26 August 2019, and ended on 17 December 2019.

Plot 
The series narrates the life of Yamelí Montoya, a beautiful woman with great talent for musical composition, who after being betrayed by the man she loves, is unjustly condemned. In prison she gives birth to a son who is taken from her, and she believes that he is dead. In prison she is also the victim of an attack and is pronounced dead, a situation that the DEA takes advantage of to give her a new identity and infiltrate her into a criminal organization. With her new identity, Lari Andrade, an important music producer, Yamelí will begin her revenge against those who ruined her life.

Cast 
 Michelle Renaud as Yamelí Montoya / Lari Andrade
 Renata Vaca as Young Yamelí
 Lambda García as Carlos Cruz "Charly Flow"
 Mané de la Parra as Juanjo
 David Caro Levy as Young Juanjo
 Polo Morín as Erick / Young Charly
 Arleth Terán as Ligia
 Gloria Stalina as Diana
 Pakey Vázquez as Ramón Cruz "Monchis"
 Rodrigo Magaña as Toño
 Adria Morales as Wendy
 Yany Prado as Irma
 Renata Manterola as Vanessa
 Pierre Louis as Axel
 Andrés de la Mora as Sergio
 Sergio Gutiérrez as Cris Vega
 Briggitte Beltrán as Zaria
 Harding Jr. as Ben Rizzo
 María Gonllegos as Carolina Pizarro
 Arturo Peniche as Edgar
 Brandon Peniche as Alberto Cantú
 Marcelo Cordoba as Jack del Castillo

Guest stars 
 Carlos Vives
 Gente de Zona

U.S. broadcast

Ratings 
  
}}

Episodes

Awards and nominations

Notes

References

External links 
 

2019 telenovelas
2019 Mexican television series debuts
2019 Mexican television series endings
2019 American television series debuts
2019 American television series endings
Mexican telenovelas
Spanish-language telenovelas
Televisa telenovelas
Mexican television series based on Colombian television series
Television series by Teleset
Television shows set in Mexico City
Television shows set in Mexico
Television shows set in Miami
Television shows filmed in Mexico
Television shows filmed in Miami
Sony Pictures Television telenovelas
Television shows remade overseas
American telenovelas
Drug Enforcement Administration in fiction
Musical telenovelas
Musical television series
Television series by Sony Pictures Television
American musical television series